, stylized as AiNA THE END, is a Japanese singer and idol. She is a founding member of the idol group Bish.

Career 
Prior to joining Bish, Aina the End moved to Tokyo and first worked as a singer at a nightclub in Shibuya, then in a backup dancing unit named Parallel for the singer Yucat. Following the disbandment of Bis, the manager of the group, Junnosuke Watanabe, began auditions for a new group named Bish in January 2015. In March of the same year, Aina the End was revealed as one of the five members who passed the auditions. Within the group, she is known for her husky voice, and has also choreographed songs for Bish and Empire.

In December 2016, Aina the End (and the rest of Bish) briefly went on hiatus as she underwent surgery for vocal polyps. She returned the next year for the release of the single "Promise the Star". After the release of Wack & Scrambles Works, a joint album of groups under the management of WACK that included the reformed Bis and Gang Parade, a popularity contest was held for all participating members. The top two ranked members would release a single together under Avex Trax. Aina the End won second place behind fellow Bish member Cent Chihiro Chicchi. The single titled "Yoru Ōji to Tsuki no Hime/Kienai de" was released on September 19, 2018, with Aina the End singing the second song.

Outside of Bish, Aina the End has appeared as the vocalist for other artists such as TeddyLoid, Mondo Grosso, Marty Friedman, My First Story, and Dish//. She also performed the outro of the 2020 television drama Shinitai Yoru ni Kagitte. The song, which is titled after the series, was the first song written entirely by Aina the End.

She released her debut solo album, The End, on February 3, 2021. Her first EP, was released on March 2.

She released her second solo album, The Zombie, on November 24, 2021.

She performed the dubbing voice for Porsha Crystal in Sing 2.

In August 2022, she is the lead actress in Broadway musical A Night with Janis Joplin.

Discography

Studio albums

Extended plays

Singles

As lead artist

As featured artist

Soundtrack appearances

Awards and nominations

References 

Living people
Musicians from Osaka
Japanese women pop singers
Japanese female idols
21st-century Japanese women singers
21st-century Japanese singers
1994 births